The Chinese Junior Artistic Gymnastics Championships is an annual gymnastics competition among the different provinces in China.

The 2012 Chinese Junior Artistic Gymnastics Championships were held from 22 June to 27 June 2012 in Hangzhou.

Women's Event Medal Winners

1997-1998

1999-2000

References

National artistic gymnastics competitions
Gymnastics competitions in China
Chinese Junior Artistic Gymnastics Championships
Chinese Junior Artistic Gymnastics Championships
Gymnastics Junior